Fabian Taylor (born 13 April 1980 in Kingston, Jamaica) is a Jamaican soccer player, who currently plays striker for Harbour View.

Club career

Harbour View 

Nicknamed Koji, Taylor started his Jamaica National Premier League career at Harbour View FC in 1999. He emerged as one of the best players in Jamaica, leading the league with 19 goals in one year.  He left the club after five years, spending 2004 on loan with the MetroStars of Major League Soccer.

MetroStars 

In his season with the MetroStars, Taylor had trouble finding playing time in a crowded front line; although he exhibited his scoring prowess very early in the season, he faded as the year passed, ending the season with only five goals and one assist in 21 games played, only eight of which he started.

Harbour View 

Back at Harbour View, he was scoring goals again, finishing 2006–07 season as third in the goalscoring charts with 15 goals.

Notodden 

In March 2008, he signed a three-year contract with Norwegian club Notodden FK. He missed half of the 2009 Adeccoligaen season with a broken leg.  Unfortunately the club was relegated at the end of the 2010 season. Taylor once again experience injury issues for Notodden FK in 2010, while the club finish second in the domestic league and failed to earn promotion to the Adeccoligaen for 2011.

Harbour View 
In February 2011, Taylor made his return to Harbour View against Boys Town FC.

International career
Taylor has been an important role player for the Jamaica national team, playing 39 games and scoring 7 goals since debuting with the team in 1999.

International goals
Scores and results list Jamaica's goal tally first.

Management 

In January 2019, Taylor was named head coach at Harbour View F.C.

References

External links
 
 
 

1980 births
Living people
Jamaican footballers
Jamaica international footballers
Jamaican expatriate footballers
Harbour View F.C. players
New York Red Bulls players
Notodden FK players
Major League Soccer players
Norwegian First Division players
Expatriate soccer players in the United States
Expatriate footballers in Norway
2003 CONCACAF Gold Cup players
Association football forwards
National Premier League players